The Sweden national football team represents Sweden in men's international football and it is controlled by the Swedish Football Association, the governing body of football in Sweden. Sweden's home ground is Friends Arena in Solna and the team is coached by Janne Andersson. From 1945 to late 1950s, they were considered one of the greatest teams in Europe.

Sweden has made twelve appearances at the World Cup with their first coming in 1934. They have also made six appearances at the European Championship. Sweden finished second at the 1958 FIFA World Cup, which they hosted, and third in both 1950 and 1994. Sweden's other accomplishments also include a gold medal at the 1948 Summer Olympics, and bronze medals in 1924 and 1952. They also reached the semi-finals at UEFA Euro 1992, also while hosting.

History 
Sweden has traditionally been a strong team in international football, with 12 World Cup appearances and 3 medals in the Olympics. The Swedish team finished second in the 1958 World Cup, when it was the host team, being beaten by Brazil 5–2 in the final. Sweden has also finished third twice, in 1950 and 1994. In 1938, they finished fourth.

Early history 

Sweden played its first international game against Norway on 12 July 1908, an 11–3 victory at Idrottsplatsen in Göteborg. Other matches in 1908 were played against England, Great Britain, the Netherlands (twice) and Belgium; Sweden lost all five matches. In the same year, Sweden competed in the 1908 Summer Olympics for the first time. Sweden, however, lost a game in the Olympics against the Great Britain 1–12, the biggest loss in the Swedish national team's history.

In 1916, Sweden defeated Denmark for the first time.

Sweden played in the 1912 Olympics (as hosts), the 1920 Olympics, and in the 1924 Olympics, where Sweden took the bronze and their first medal ever.

1938 FIFA World Cup 
The 1938 World Cup was Sweden's second qualification for the World Cup. In the first round, they were scheduled to play against Austria, but after Germany's occupation of Austria, the Austrian team could not continue playing in the tournament. Instead, Sweden went straight to the quarter-finals match against Cuba. They beat Cuba 8–0 with both Harry Andersson (on his debut) and Gustav Wetterström scoring hat-tricks. In the semi-final match against Hungary, Sweden lost 1–5. Sweden's next match was the third-place match against Brazil. In that game the Swedes lost 2–4, and ended in fourth place for the first and only time in Swedish football history.

1948 Summer Olympics 

In the first round, Sweden played against Austria. The Austrian team had qualified without their professional players, which was a surprise since the Austrian league had many professional players who were allowed to play in the tournament. The match was played at White Hart Lane in London and Sweden won 3–0. In the second game, Sweden played against Korea and won 12–0, one of the two largest margin wins Sweden has ever had. In the semi-final Sweden met their archrivals from Denmark beating them 4–2.

The final was played at legendary Wembley Stadium in London. The attendance was around 40,000 people which was high for a football game in those days. Sweden took on Yugoslavia in the final and won 3–1, with goals by Gunnar Gren (24', 67'), Stjepan Bobek (42') and Gunnar Nordahl (48'). This was Sweden's first championship win in any international football tournament.

1950 FIFA World Cup 

In the 1950 World Cup, the Swedish football association did not allow any professional Swedish football players to take part. Consequently, Sweden only fielded amateur players during the tournament.

Qualifying for the tournament as one of six European national teams, Sweden played in the same group as Italy and Paraguay. (India withdrew from the group.)

In the first match, Sweden beat Italy 3–2 in São Paulo. The second match was a 2–2 draw against Paraguay. With the most points in the group, Sweden advanced to the next round.

Their first game in the second stage – also a group format – was against the hosts Brazil. It was played at the Maracanã Stadium with a total attendance of more than 138,000, to this day the record attendance for the Swedish national team. The game ended 7–1 to Brazil and it is rumored that almost everyone in the Brazilian audience waved the Swedes goodbye with their scarfs.

The next game was against Uruguay, who Sweden played against for the first time in World Cup history. Played in São Paulo, Uruguay won the game 3–2, which meant Sweden were unable to play for the gold.

The final game for Sweden in the tournament was played in São Paulo, against Spain. Sweden won 3–1 with goals by Stig Sundqvist (15'), Bror Mellberg (34') and Karl-Erik Palmér (79'). Sweden finished 3rd in the group and took their first World Cup medal.  As Sweden was the best placed European team, Sweden was, as the time, regarded "unofficial European champions".

At the Summer Olympics in 1952 in Helsinki, Sweden continued to achieve success and won an Olympic bronze. The following year, the Football Association decided not to allow foreign professionals to play in the national team and the team failed to qualify for the World Championships in Switzerland in 1954 when Sweden only came second in their qualifying group behind Belgium.

1958 FIFA World Cup success 

In 1956, the Swedish football federation allowed the professional footballers to play for the national team again, giving Swedish football fans hope for the 1958 FIFA World Cup. Sweden, the host nation, were in the same group as Mexico, Hungary and Wales.

The first game, Sweden vs Mexico, was played at Sweden's national stadium, Råsunda Stadium, Solna, and was attended by around 32,000 people. Sweden won the game 3–0, taking the lead in Group 3. The next match was against Hungary, who had finished 2nd in the 1954 World Cup in Switzerland and were also the 1952 Olympic Champions. Also played at Råsunda, this game ended 2–1 to Sweden, with both goals scored by Kurt Hamrin. In the next match, against Wales, Sweden drew 0–0.

Making it through to the quarter-finals, playing at Råsunda for the fourth time in this tournament, Sweden were up against the USSR and won 2–0.

The semifinal at Ullevi, Gothenburg, was the only game in the tournament which Sweden did not play at Råsunda. The crowd of around 50,000 people attended one of the best games Sweden played in the tournament. West Germany led by 1–0 when Erich Juskowiak was sent off in the 59th minute. Sweden won 3–1.

The final was played at Råsunda between host nation Sweden and the 1950 FIFA World Cup runners-up, Brazil. The total attendance was approximately 52,000 people. Brazil ended up winning the World Cup for the first time ever after beating Sweden by 5–2. Sweden consequently became runners-up, the best result for Sweden in any World Cup and the only Nordic country to achieve this so far. After the final match the Brazilian players honoured the host nation by sprinting around the pitch holding a Swedish flag.

1960s 

After the successful 1958 World Cup, Sweden's fortunes diminished. In the qualification round of the 1962 World Cup, Sweden won its group in impressive fashion (scoring 10 goals and only having 3 goals scored against it), but it still had to win a play-off game against Switzerland to qualify. The game was played in West Berlin, and the Swiss won, 2–1.

Sweden almost got to the UEFA European Championship 1964. They started their play-off against Norway and won the first game and drew in the last game.  In the second round, Sweden beat Yugoslavia, 3–2, but they lost the first game. In the quarter-finals, Sweden played against the defending champions, the Soviet Union. Sweden tied the first game but lost the second.

During the 1966 World Cup qualification, Sweden was in the UEFA Qualification group 2. Sweden started the qualification with a draw against West Germany and then a 3–0 victory over Cyprus. But only the winner of the group advanced and Sweden was eliminated with a loss in its next game against West Germany.

Sweden successfully entered the UEFA European Championship in 1968, but they finished in the Qualification group 2.

Sweden's only major success in the '60s was to qualify for the 1970 World Cup, after winning UEFA Group 5 ahead of Norway and France.  Sweden finished third in its group, losing a tie-breaker with eventual #4 Uruguay, and did not advance to the elimination round, however.  The winner of Sweden's group was eventual world runner-up Italy.

1974 FIFA World Cup 
In the qualification of the 1974 FIFA World Cup, Sweden was in the same group as Austria, Hungary and Malta. Sweden clinched a narrow win via a classic play off-match against Austria in a snowy Gelsenkirchen, and advanced to the World Cup finals in Germany.

The group Sweden drew into included Uruguay, Netherlands and Bulgaria. The first game against Bulgaria ended in a draw. In the second game against the Netherlands, Sweden drew another tie. The last game of the round was played against Uruguay. That game was the first victory Sweden had in the tournament, when they beat Uruguay 3–0 with goals by Roland Sandberg (74') and Ralf Edström (46', 77'). Sweden finished 2nd in the group and advanced to the second group stage.

In the second group stage, Sweden was defeated in the first game against Poland 0–1. The situation after the defeat against Poland was that if Sweden lost against West Germany with a single goal difference and Yugoslavia defeated Poland, Sweden would be second in the group and play for the bronze medal. But since Poland beat Yugoslavia 2–1, Sweden had to win the game against the host nation, West Germany, in order to finish second in the group.

The game against West Germany was played in Düsseldorf with an attendance of 66,500 people. The Swedish striker Ralf Edström gave the Scandinavian the lead with 1–0 after 29 minutes. But in the second half West Germany took control of the game, even after Roland Sandberg's equaliser after 52 minutes. Germany won 4–2. After the tournament, the German players commented that the game against Sweden was their best game in that tournament. The last game for Sweden was played in Düsseldorf against Yugoslavia. Sweden won that game 2–1. They finished the tournament as the 5th place team. The Swedish team had profiles that Ronnie Hellström, Bo Larsson and Björn Nordqvist.

Sweden did not qualify for the European Championship quarter-finals game in 1976. On 11 May 1976, Sweden lost for the first time since 1937 at home to Denmark.

1978 FIFA World Cup 
1978 took Sweden for the third consecutive World Cup. Sweden made it from the qualifiers in a three team group with Switzerland and Norway as opponents. The qualifying session was played in 1976 and 1977 in the World Cup 1978 in Argentina, Sweden played the first match with a draw (1–1) against Brazil. Swedish scorer was Thomas Sjöberg. 1–1 was Sweden's best result so far in the World Cup against Brazil context (the result was repeated between the two countries at the World Cup finals in 1994). The team then lost against Austria (0–1) and Spain (0–1). The Swedish team finished last in the group with 1 point and goal difference 1–3. Several of the profiles from 1974, still with (Larsson, Edström, Nordqvist) but also new players such as Anders Linderoth, Hasse Borg and Torbjörn Nilsson.

1979–1990 
After the successful 1970s, reaching all three World Cups, Sweden changed their coach from Georg "Åby" Ericson to Lars "Laban" Arnesson. Arnesson had been a successful coach for Östers IF before becoming national team coach. Sweden failed to qualify for the UEFA Euro 1980 after only managing to win against Luxembourg in qualifying in a group that also included Czechoslovakia and France, and the 1982 FIFA World Cup, ending third to Scotland and Northern Ireland. In 1983, Sweden met Brazil in Gothenburg to play a friendly, the match ended 3–3. They failed to qualify for the UEFA Euro 1984, despite defeating the then-reigning world champions Italy 3–0 in Naples, including two goals by Glenn Strömberg, but were unable to prevail against Romania in the battle for the top spot, losing both away and at home against the Tricolours. The Swedish setbacks continued. After the failed qualification for the 1986 World Cup, Olle Nordin took over the team. Sweden lost their match against Czechoslovakia with 1–2 in the final qualifying round, while Portugal unexpectedly won 1–0 away against West Germany and took second place in the group. It was West Germany's first ever loss in a World Cup qualifier.

Sweden also failed to qualify to the UEFA Euro 1988 in West Germany. They won their qualification group for the 1990 World Cup ahead of England and went on to their first World Cup in 12 years. However, the World Cup campaign ended quickly after three 1–2 defeats in the group stage matches, against Brazil, Scotland and Costa Rica. As of May 2018, it is the only time that Sweden has failed to score points in a World Cup tournament. After the World Cup, Olle Nordin resigned and Nisse Andersson became an interim coach until Tommy Svensson took over in 1991.

UEFA Euro 1992
As the host of the UEFA Euro 1992, Sweden played in their first ever European Championship tournament. They were drawn in group A with Denmark, France and England. Sweden managed to advance as group winners ahead of the eventual champions Denmark. In the semi-finals following the group stage, Sweden were eliminated by Germany with 2–3. As of July 2016, the semi-final place remains Sweden's best result ever in a European Championship.

1994 FIFA World Cup
Sweden qualified for the 1994 World Cup in the United States at the top of their qualifying group ahead of Bulgaria and France. Sweden was placed in Group B with Brazil, Cameroon and Russia. The first game against Cameroon in Los Angeles looked to be yet another 1–2 loss, (after the 1990 World Cup fiasco with losses of 1–2 in all three games) but in the 75th minute, Martin Dahlin scored the equaliser from a rebound shot off of Henrik Larsson and the match finished 2–2. In the next game against Russia in Detroit, Russia was handed an early penalty and made it 1–0. Sweden managed to come back, with a penalty goal from Tomas Brolin and two goals from Martin Dahlin, with the result being 3–1. In the last group stage match, against Brazil (also in Detroit), they tied 1–1 after goals by Kennet Andersson ('23) and Romário ('47).

In the first knockout-stage match, Sweden faced Saudi Arabia in the extreme heat and humidity of Dallas, where the game started at the hottest time of day- 4:30 p.m. where temperatures went past 40C (104F) in an outdoor stadium. Sweden won 3–1 after two goals from Kennet Andersson and one from Martin Dahlin. Sweden's quarter-final match in San Francisco against Romania has become a memorable match for Swedish football fans. After Sweden had scored late in the second half, Romania managed to equalise in the dying minutes of the match, sending it into extra time. Romania's Florin Răducioiu, who scored the first goal for Romania, scored his second of the day to take Romania ahead at the 101st minute. But with five minutes left, Kennet Andersson scored with a header to make it level at 2–2. The penalty shoot-out began with a miss from Håkan Mild of Sweden, but Thomas Ravelli managed to save two penalties from Daniel Prodan and Miodrag Belodedici, giving Sweden the win and making himself a hero. Sweden advanced to the semi-finals, where they were to face Brazil in Los Angeles. They had managed to score in the group stage against Brazil but couldn't do it a second time. After Jonas Thern had been sent off with a red card, Romário scored the only goal of the game in the 80th minute.

In the third-place match, Sweden played against a Bulgaria side that had lost to Italy in their semi-final match in New York City. Sweden scored 4 goals in the first half, but the second half went goal-less. Sweden finished 3rd and won the bronze medal, the best placing for the national team in a World Cup since the 1958 silver medal. This led Sweden to a second-place in the FIFA Men's World Rankings for one month, in November 1994.

They finished as the top scorers of the tournament, with 15 goals scored in total.

1995–1997 
After the World Cup in 1994, Sweden had difficulty reaching up to the same level. The national team was knocked out in qualifying for the 1996 European Championships in England and the World Cup in France in 1998. The qualification for the Euro 96 had started with a win for Sweden 1–0 away against Iceland in September 1994, but then lost against Switzerland away from home. In November 1994, Tomas Brolin broke his foot in a win against Hungary. In the spring of 1995 continued failure in the European Championship qualifiers. Sweden lost the away games against Turkey and played 1–1 draw at home to Iceland. When Sweden drew 0–0 against Switzerland in Gothenburg in September 1995, it was clear that the team would miss the European Championship finals.

The qualifying game for the France 98 was not better. In October 1996, Austria won 1–0 in Stockholm and the month after the Swedes lost against Scotland on away ground. Admittedly, Sweden won against Scotland in the return match in Gothenburg on Walpurgis Night in 1997, but in September 1997 won Austria 1–0 in Vienna. In October 1997, Tommy Svensson quit as head coach and Tommy Söderberg took over.

UEFA Euro 2000 
Sweden qualified impressively for this tournament, winning all games except the away game against England (0–0) and conceding only one goal. The finals however, were a great disappointment. Sweden lost their opening game on 10 June against the host Belgium 1–2. Johan Mjällby scored the goal for Sweden in the 53rd minute after an error by Belgian goalkeeper Filip De Wilde, while Belgium won via goals from Bart Goor in the 43rd minute and Émile Mpenza in the 46th. Then on 15 June Sweden played 0–0 against Turkey. On 19 June, Sweden lost 2–1 to eventual runners-up Italy in the last group stage match. Luigi Di Biagio scored with a header on a corner kick in the first half to give Italy the lead. Late in the second half, Henrik Larsson equalised to 1–1. But after Daniel Andersson lost control of the ball, Alessandro Del Piero shot it into the top corner. Sweden finished the group last behind Belgium with only 1 point. Italy finished first and Turkey second.

2002 FIFA World Cup 

Sweden qualified undefeated for the 2002 FIFA World Cup, ahead of eventual third placed Turkey. Sweden was drawn in the "group of death", Group F, which also featured big favourites Argentina, England and Nigeria. The first match was against England on 2 June. Sol Campbell gave England the lead in the first half by heading in a left-side corner from David Beckham. The equalising goal was scored by midfielder Niclas Alexandersson, a powerful left-foot shot from outside the box past David Seaman. The match ended 1–1. In the next game on 7 June, Sweden played Nigeria. Julius Aghahowa gave Nigeria the lead by heading in a cross from the right. Sweden managed to equalise with a goal by Henrik Larsson. Later in the game, Larsson was fouled in the penalty area and Sweden were awarded with a penalty which Larsson himself put in the goal. Sweden won 2–1.

In the final group match on 12 June, Sweden played Argentina, who needed to win after losing 0–1 to England in the previous game. Sweden midfielder Anders Svensson scored a freekick goal from 30 meters. Andreas Andersson had a shot off the crossbar and out in an attempt to extend the lead. Mattias Jonson committed a foul in the penalty area and Argentina was awarded a penalty. Ariel Ortega shot straight on Magnus Hedman, the Swedish keeper, but Hernán Crespo rushed into the box and shot the rebound from Hedman between the keeper's legs. The goal was controversial because Crespo began running into the box at the same time as Ortega stepped up to shoot. However, the match ended 1–1 and Sweden won the group, England on second place, Argentina third and Nigeria last.

In the round of 16 on 16 June, Sweden played Senegal. Henrik Larsson gave Sweden an early lead by heading in a corner from Anders Svensson. Senegal equalised through Henri Camara. They also had a goal disallowed for offside. The game came to sudden death golden goal. Rising star Zlatan Ibrahimović came on and nearly won Sweden the game. He made a terrific run on the right wing past several Senegal players, and shot with his weaker left foot from a tight angle straight at Senegal's keeper Tony Sylva. Ibrahimović had Larsson and Svensson in excellent positions for a pass, but shot instead. Then Svensson made a great spin past a defender and hit the post with a powerful shot, which Sylva would have had no chance of saving, had it gone inside the posts. Camara then took a weak shot which went past Hedman, off the post and into the goal. Consequently, Sweden were eliminated. Henrik Larsson announced his retirement from the national team after the tournament.

UEFA Euro 2004 

Despite another impressive qualifying campaign and the unexpected return of Henrik Larsson, Sweden came into the tournament in Portugal with low expectations. But after a dazzling 5–0 win against Bulgaria on 14 June, they became one of the favorites. Freddie Ljungberg began the goal-fest after a well done pass by Zlatan Ibrahimović. Henrik Larsson scored 2–0 and 3–0 in the second half. His first goal was a diving header after a perfectly taken crossball from the left by Erik Edman. 4–0 was scored by Zlatan Ibrahimović on a penalty and the substitute Marcus Allbäck scored the last goal of the game. After the 5–0 victory, Sweden became a feared team in the tournament and many were surprised by Sweden's offensive play since they were known to mostly play a defensive form of football.

In the next game on 18 June, they were set up against Italy, who would prove themselves as a very hard opponent. After 36 minutes Antonio Cassano scored the first goal of the game for Italy after a cross by Christian Panucci. A great game by Swedish goalkeeper Andreas Isaksson made Sweden survive the rest of the game and after 84 minutes, Zlatan Ibrahimović scored a backheel goal to make it 1–1, which became the final score.

Sweden's last game of the group was held against Denmark. It was said before the game that if Sweden and Denmark played 2–2, Italy would be eliminated from the tournament. This is exactly what happened. Denmark led the game by 2–1 for a long time. But at the end of the game, Mattias Jonson scored the equaliser after numerous rebounds. Italy was eliminated and both Denmark and Sweden was qualified for the quarter-finals.

In the quarter-finals on 26 June, Sweden played against Holland. The game became goalless after full-time, but not without a lot of chances. The closest Sweden came to scoring was through Freddie Ljungberg but he hit the post with a well taken shot. Henrik Larsson also hit the cross bar from close range. After a goalless extra time, the game went to a penalty shootout. After a long run of penalties were taken, it was Olof Mellberg's turn to take a shot. The Dutch goalkeeper Edwin van der Sar saved Mellberg's shot and Sweden lost the penalty shoot out after Arjen Robben converted the following penalty.

2006 FIFA World Cup 
Sweden qualified for the World Cup as the best runner-up, behind Croatia, who won their qualifying group. At the World Cup draw in December 2005, Sweden were drawn in Group B together with England, Paraguay and Trinidad and Tobago. Their squad for the tournament featured players who played club football in eleven different nations.	
Sweden started the World Cup slowly, recording a goal-less draw on 10 June in Dortmund against unheralded Trinidad and Tobago, despite playing with a one-man advantage for most of the game. The second game, against Paraguay on 15 June in Berlin, looked to be another goal-less draw until Freddie Ljungberg scored with a header in the 89th minute to give Sweden a 1–0 victory. On 20 June, Sweden played their last group stage match against England in Cologne. Joe Cole scored 1–0 for England with a spectacular long range shot in the 34th minute. Marcus Allbäck equalised to 1–1 with a header in the 51st minute. When Steven Gerrard scored with a header in the 85th minute, it looked like England would win the game. However, Henrik Larsson made it 2–2 from close range in the 90th minute. The draw was enough for Sweden to go through to the round of 16. On 24 June, Sweden's World Cup run came to an end with a 2–0 defeat to the host nation, Germany in Munich, after two early goals by Lukas Podolski. Defender Teddy Lučić was controversely sent off by referee Carlos Simon, who was captured laughing while holding up a questionable red card. Henrik Larsson missed a penalty kick early in the second half. After the tournament, Mattias Jonson and Teddy Lučić announced they had retired from the national team. On 17 July, Henrik Larsson retired for a second time from the national team.

UEFA Euro 2008 and 2010 FIFA World Cup qualifiers 

Sweden finished second in Group F behind Spain, and qualified for the finals as the best runner up. The qualifying campaign included an abandoned match away to Denmark, for which Sweden were awarded a 3–0 win by UEFA.

Prior to the final tournament, Henrik Larsson made another sensational return to the national team, nearly aged 37. Sweden were drawn in Group D together with Spain, Greece and Russia. In their first match in Euro 2008 on 10 June, they beat the reigning European champions, Greece, by a score of 2–0 with goals from Zlatan Ibrahimović and Petter Hansson. Their next game was against Spain on 14 June. The game looked like a draw until a 92nd-minute strike from David Villa, which put the Spaniards ahead. In the final group match on 18 June, the Swedes went on to lose 2–0 to the Russians, eliminating them from the tournament. Freddie Ljungberg, Marcus Allbäck and Niclas Alexandersson all chose to retire from the national team after Sweden was eliminated.

The 2010 FIFA World Cup qualification ended disastrously for Sweden. In the first game in Tirana, they were only able to tie 0–0 with an Albanian side that they were expected to defeat easily. Four days later, Sweden beat Hungary, 2–1, with goals from Kim Källström and Samuel Holmén. They would go on to tie with Portugal twice, both in Stockholm and in Porto. Both games ended 0–0. Sweden would lose to Denmark on home ground with an early strike from Thomas Kahlenberg after a defensive mistake by Mikael Nilsson. Kim Källström had a penalty kick saved early in the first half, which proved to be decisive. Sweden recovered with a 4–0 hammering of Malta. Against Hungary and Malta, both of the winning goals for Sweden were scored late. They would lose to Denmark again at Parken Stadium in Copenhagen after a late goal from Jakob Poulsen. Meanwhile, Portugal defeated Hungary, 3–0, putting the Portuguese team ahead in the standings. Sweden would defeat Albania, 4–1; however, Sweden was eliminated by Portugal's 4–0 defeat of Malta. Lars Lagerbäck resigned and Erik Hamrén was appointed the next head coach. Several veteran players chose to retire after Sweden failed to reach the World Cup, including Daniel Andersson, Mikael Nilsson and Henrik Larsson, his third and final retirement. Zlatan Ibrahimović took a break from the national team due to Sweden missing the World Cup. He returned almost a year later, in August 2010, and was named Sweden captain by the new coach Hamrén.

UEFA Euro 2012 and 2014 FIFA World Cup qualifiers 
Sweden's Euro 2012 campaign with their new coach, Erik Hamrén, started well with two consecutive wins in Group E against Hungary and San Marino. After that Sweden lost to the Netherlands in Amsterdam with 1–4, but then won against Moldova first in Stockholm with 2–1 and later in Chișinău with 4–1. After the battle against Moldova Sweden beat their neighbor Finland with 5–0. The following game was a defeat when Hungary through Rudolf scored 2–1 home at Stadium Puskás Ferenc at the last minute of full-time. After that Sweden defeated San Marino with 5–0 away including two goals from Christian Wilhelmsson, who before the two games against San Marino and Hungary hadn't been a regular in the starting eleven during Hamréns tenure as head coach. The Swedish team then proceeded to beat Finland with 2–1 and in the final game beat the Netherlands with 3–2 to end their streak of 17 consecutive qualification-game wins. On 2 December 2011, Sweden were drawn into Group D alongside England, Ukraine and France in the Euro 2012 competition.

Sweden played their opening match on 11 June against Ukraine. Zlatan Ibrahimović scored from close range after a pass from Kim Källström in the 52nd minute. Andriy Shevchenko equalised by heading in a corner just three minutes later, and in the 62nd minute, he scored another header. Sweden were unable to respond to this and lost the match 1–2.
Sweden played their second group stage match against England on 15 June. Andy Carroll scored 1–0 for England with a powerful header in the 23rd minute. Sweden equalised through an own goal by Glen Johnson and took the lead when Olof Mellberg scored 2–1 in the 59th minute. However, England turned the game around with goals by Theo Walcott and Danny Welbeck. The two losses meant that Sweden were already eliminated from the next stage. In the third group stage game on 19 June, Sweden played against France. Zlatan Ibrahimović scored a spectacular flying volley early in the second half and Sebastian Larsson sealed a meaningless 2–0 win during stoppage time. After Sweden's early exit from the tournament, the veteran Olof Mellberg announced his retirement from the national team.

Playing in Group C of the 2014 FIFA World Cup qualifiers, Sweden finished second behind Germany, and was one of eight teams to move on to the second round of qualification. A notable result during group play was their match in Germany on 16 October 2012 where they fought back from 4–0 down with 30 minutes remaining to draw the game 4–4 at the Olympiastadion, and was widely regarded as one of the most memorable comebacks in football history.

Sweden's new national stadium Friends Arena in Solna was opened on 14 November 2012 with a friendly match against England, which Sweden won 4–2. Zlatan Ibrahimović scored four goals in a world class performance. His fourth goal was an extraordinary overhead bicycle kick from 35 yards, which later won the FIFA Puskás Award for goal of the year.

A key win in their group was the home game against Austria on 11 October 2013, as Martin Olsson and Zlatan Ibrahimović both scored in the second half to secure the win at the Friends Arena.

Using the October 2013 FIFA World Rankings, Sweden was ranked 25th overall and would face one of the four highest ranked teams in the second round of qualification. They were drawn to face Portugal, the team that beat Sweden for a qualification spot in the 2010 World Cup qualifiers. Cristiano Ronaldo scored the only goal in a 1–0 win for Portugal the first match in Lisbon on 15 November. 
The return match was played on 19 November at Friends Arena in Solna. After Ronaldo scored 1–0 for Portugal, Zlatan Ibrahimović scored two quick goals to make it 2–2 on aggregate. Sweden still needed to score a third goal because of Portugal's away goal. However, Ronaldo scored two more counter-attack goals and Portugal won the game 3–2 and 4–2 on aggregate. This meant that Sweden once again failed to qualify for the World Cup. Due to this, Sweden's most capped player of all time Anders Svensson decided to end his international career.

UEFA Euro 2016 

Competing in Group G of the UEFA Euro 2016 qualifiers, Sweden picked up their first point on the road in Austria with a 1–1 draw on 8 September 2014. After a 1–1 draw against Russia at the Friends Arena, Sweden then picked up their first win in their next match with a 2–0 result against Liechtenstein. Sweden then went unbeaten for another three matches before suffering two consecutive defeats, a 1–0 loss to Russia in Moscow and a crushing 4–1 home defeat to group leaders Austria. This caused Sweden to move down to third place in their group, just one point above fourth-placed Montenegro. Sweden then bounced back to win their final two group games against Liechtenstein and Moldova with the scoreline being 2–0 on both occasions. They finished their group in third position behind Austria and Russia and qualified for the playoffs. Sweden were drawn against big rivals Denmark and won 4–3 on aggregate, qualifying for the UEFA Euro 2016. They were, however, eliminated from the group stage, losing to Italy and Belgium, drawing with the Republic of Ireland and scoring no goals of their own (their only goal was an own goal by Ciaran Clark).

2018 FIFA World Cup 

On 25 July 2015, Sweden were drawn in Group A of 2018 FIFA World Cup qualification. The team scored six wins, a draw and three losses. As a result, they tied with the Netherlands in points, and claimed second place behind eventual world champions France on goal difference.

On 13 November 2017, Sweden qualified for the 2018 World Cup after a 0–0 draw away to Italy at the San Siro during the second leg of their qualification play-off match. As Sweden had won the first match 1–0, this resulted in a Swedish win on aggregate, making their return to the World Cup for the first time in 12 years.

At the 2018 World Cup, Sweden started its campaign by a 1–0 win over South Korea in the first match on 18 June, through a penalty goal by Andreas Granqvist, decided by the new VAR technology. Their second match on 23 June was against Germany. Ola Toivonen scored 1–0 for Sweden by lobbing the ball over the German goalkeeper Manuel Neuer in the first half. However, Marco Reus equalised to 1–1 early on in the second half. With 15 seconds remaining on the five stoppage time minutes, Toni Kroos won the game for Germany by scoring a free kick from just outside the penalty area, after a foul by Jimmy Durmaz. Despite this loss, Sweden advanced to the knockout stage top of the group with a 3–0 win over Mexico, while Germany were knocked out bottom of the group with a 2–0 loss to South Korea.

On 3 July 2018, Sweden played Switzerland in the round of 16, beating them 1–0 with a goal by Emil Forsberg, and advancing to the quarter finals for the first time since 1994. In the quarter-finals, Sweden suffered a 2–0 defeat to England and was thus knocked out.

2018–19 UEFA Nations League 
Sweden were drawn with Turkey and Russia in the League B. Sweden started their campaign on 10 September with a 2–3 defeat against Turkey in Solna, after leading 2–1 with only a few minutes remaining. A month later, Sweden earned a point in a 0–0 draw against Russia in Kaliningrad. With two matches remaining, Sweden had to win both to top the group and to be promoted to the 2020–21 UEFA Nations League A. On 17 November, Sweden beat Turkey 0–1 in Konya after a penalty goal from captain Andreas Granqvist. Three days later, they achieved a 2–0 victory over Russia in Solna. The two wins meant promotion for Sweden to League A and a guaranteed play-off spot for the UEFA Euro 2020, should they not qualify directly via the regular qualification process.

UEFA Euro 2020 
The draw for the UEFA Euro 2020 qualifying was held on 2 December 2018. Sweden were seeded in pot 2 and drawn in Group F together with Spain, Norway, Romania, Faroe Islands and Malta.

Sweden started their qualifying campaign on 23 March 2019 with a 2–1 win against Romania at Friends Arena in Solna. The goals were scored by Robin Quaison and Viktor Claesson. Three days later, Sweden played against Norway at the Ullevaal Stadion in Oslo. This was the first competitive match between the nations since the 1978 FIFA World Cup qualification. After trailing 0–2 well into the second half, Sweden turned the match around with goals once again by Claesson and Quaison to make it 3–2 late in the game. However, Ola Kamara equalised for Norway on their only corner of the game to make it 3–3 in the last minute of added time. On 7 June, Sweden played against Malta at the Friends Arena in Solna. For the third consecutive game, Robin Quaison and Viktor Claesson scored in a 3–0 victory. On 10 June, Sweden lost 0–3 against Spain at the Santiago Bernabéu Stadium in Madrid.

On 5 September, Sweden played away against Faroe Islands in Tórshavn. Alexander Isak scored two goals in the first 15 minutes of the match. Then Victor Lindelöf and Robin Quaison scored a goal each before half time, to seal a comfortable 4–0 win. Three days later, Sweden played the return fixture against neighbours Norway at Friends Arena in Solna. Stefan Johansen scored 1–0 for Norway just before half time after a mistake by Andreas Granqvist. Fifteen minutes into the second half, Emil Forsberg scored 1–1 which became the result.

On 12 October, Sweden defeated Malta in Ta' Qali with 4–0. The debutant Marcus Danielson scored and Sebastian Larsson scored two penalty goals. These were Larsson's first international goals since he scored against France in UEFA Euro 2012. Three days later, Sweden played the return fixture against Spain at Friends Arena in Solna. Early in the second half, Marcus Berg scored 1–0 for Sweden with a header from close range. Rodrigo equalised for Spain in the second minute of added time, and the game ended 1–1.

On 15 November, Sweden defeated Romania 2–0 in Bucharest with goals by Marcus Berg and Robin Quaison in the first half. The win meant that Sweden had secured second place in the group and a spot at UEFA Euro 2020, their sixth consecutive European championship.

The draw for the final tournament was held on 30 November 2019 in Bucharest, Romania. Sweden were seeded in pot 3 and drawn in Group E together with Spain from pot 1, Poland from pot 2 and Slovakia from pot 4, who qualified via play-off.

The tournament began for Sweden on 14 June 2021 in Seville against a familiar Spain side who they had faced in qualifying. The match was quite an anomaly as Spain had 86% possession and 17 shots against Sweden, but it was not enough to score as the match finished 0–0. However, Alexander Isak's UEFA Euro debut provided moments of individual brilliance which caught the eyes of viewers on a match that had little otherwise to offer attacking-wise for Swedish fans.

Four days later, Sweden would face off against Slovakia in Saint Petersburg. The match provided no goals until the 77th minute where Emil Forsberg slotted home a penalty after Slovakian goalkeeper, Martin Dúbravka, took out Robin Quaison in the box. After holding the Slovakian side to zero shots on target, the match would finish 1–0 in favor of the Swedes. This result would seal Sweden's place in the knockout rounds.

On 23 June, Sweden would play their final group game against a Poland side, featuring Robert Lewandowski, desperate to win for their own chances of entering the knockout round. In the 2nd minute, however, Emil Forsberg would score Sweden's first goal from open-play in the tournament. In the 59th minute, Forsberg's second goal of the match was provided by an eager Dejan Kulusveski, who missed the opening matches of the tournament due to a COVID-19 diagnosis. He entered the pitch less than 5 minutes prior to his run from the half-way line which lead to his first assist in a Sweden senior team shirt. Like Isak two matches prior, this was his UEFA Euro debut. 2 minutes after Forsberg's second goal of the match, Lewandowski would score a curling effort into the corner, pulling a goal back for the Poles. He would go onto to score again an equalizer in the 84th minute. Stoppage time arrived and so would a Swedish winner in the 4th minute of stoppage time courtesy of another Kulusveski assist to Viktor Claesson. This 90th-minute winner would secure Sweden's spot in first place of UEFA Euro 2020 Group E.

Sweden would face off against Ukraine in the Round of 16 on 29 June in Glasgow. After an opening goal from Ukrainian wing-back and Manchester City player, Oleksandr Zinchenko, Emil Forsberg would once again pull out the heroics just before half-time in the 43rd minute to even up the match. After another 45 minutes and no additional goals, the tie headed to extra-time. In the 99th minute, Marcus Danielson was shown a straight red card after a tackle on Artem Besyedin. The tie would not see penalties as Artem Dovbyk stuck a 120th-minute header into the back of the net following a cross from Zinchenko. This would end an otherwise formidable tournament for Janne Andersson's side.

2020–21 UEFA Nations League 
Promoted to League A, Sweden was drawn in Group A3 together with reigning champions Portugal, reigning World champions France and 2018 World Cup-runners up Croatia. They started their campaign with a 0–1 defeat against France at Friends Arena on 5 September 2020. Sweden's next game was played against Portugal at the same stadium three days later. They lost 0–2 after Gustav Svensson was sent off just before half time and Cristiano Ronaldo scored a brace.

On 11 October, Sweden looked to draw 1–1 against Croatia in Zagreb after Marcus Berg's goal, but a defensive mistake by Pontus Jansson late in the match gave Croatia a 2–1 win. Three days later, they were defeated 0–3 by Portugal in Lisbon. Four consecutive defeats in competitive matches means Sweden's worst streak of results for 108 years, going back to 1912. On 14 November, Sweden played the return game against Croatia at Friends Arena and won 2–1 after goals by Dejan Kulusevski and Marcus Danielson, but Danielson's fatal own goal late in the game would prove to be detrimental. Three days later, Sweden played against France in Paris and took an early lead via Viktor Claesson. However, France turned the match around to win 4–2. The second Swedish goal was scored by Robin Quaison. This result meant that Sweden finished last in the group due to inferior goal difference to Croatia and will be relegated to League B for the next UEFA Nations League tournament.

2022 FIFA World Cup qualifiers 
For the 2022 FIFA World Cup qualification, Sweden were drawn in Group B along with Spain, Greece, Georgia and Kosovo. On 16 March 2021, Zlatan Ibrahimović was included in the squad for the first time in almost five years, following his retirement from the national team after Euro 2016. On 25 March 2021, Sweden beat Georgia 1–0 at Friends Arena after a goal by Viktor Claesson, with Ibrahimović providing the assist. With his 117th appearance, Ibrahimović officially became Sweden's oldest player of all time at the age of 39 years, five months and 22 days, taking over Thomas Ravelli's record from 11 October 1997. On 28 March, Sweden beat Kosovo 3–0 in Pristina, with Ibrahimović setting up both Ludwig Augustinsson for the first goal and Alexander Isak for the second goal. Captain for the day Sebastian Larsson then scored from the penalty spot.

On 2 September, Sweden played against Spain in Solna. Carlos Soler scored for Spain after only 3 minutes played, but Alexander Isak equalized 11 seconds after the following kick-off. Early in the second half, Dejan Kulusevski set up Viktor Claesson who scored 2–1 which became the result. This was the first time Spain had been beaten in a World Cup qualifier since 1993. On 8 September, Sweden lost 1–2 against Greece in Athens, with substitute Robin Quaison scoring the only Swedish goal.

On 9 October, Sweden played against Kosovo at Friends Arena. Emil Forsberg scored from the penalty spot in the first half after a long-awaited VAR decision on handball. In the second half, Alexander Isak scored a great long shot in the top corner. Robin Quaison then sealed a 3–0 victory on his 28th birthday. Three days later, Sweden hosted Greece at the same stadium. A poor first half with Greece looking the better team and hitting the woodwork twice,
Sweden stepped up in the second half. Emil Forsberg scored a penalty after Alexander Isak was taken down in the box. Then Isak himself scored 2–0 after a long goalkick by Robin Olsen. The win meant that Sweden went top of the group, two points ahead of Spain with two matches remaining.

On 11 November, Sweden suffered a shocking 2–0 loss away against Georgia. Ranked 93rd in the world at the time, Georgia is the lowest ranked team that has ever defeated Sweden. On 14 November, Sweden played the return fixture against Spain in Seville. Despite creating the best chances to score, Sweden lost the match 1–0 after Álvaro Morata scored on a rebound in the 86th minute. This meant that Sweden finished second place in the group, and entered the play-off round as one of six seeded teams in late March 2022.

On 24 March, Sweden played against Czech Republic in the play-off semi final in Solna. The game was scoreless after 90 minutes and went into extra time, where Robin Quaison scored the winning goal. On 29 March, Sweden lost 2–0 to Poland at the Stadion Śląski due to goals from Robert Lewandowski and Piotr Zieliński and thus failed to qualify for the World Cup.

2022–23 UEFA Nations League 

Sweden competed in League B against Norway, Serbia and Slovenia. Their campaign started promosing with a 2–0 away win against Slovenia. However, after that Sweden suffered four straight losses before only managing a draw at home to Slovenia. This meant that Sweden finished last in the group and will be relegated to League C for the 2024–25 UEFA Nations League.

Team image

Supporters 

Swedish supporters showed up first during the 1912 Summer Olympics, where they chanted "Heja Sverige / friskt humör / det är det som susen gör" (roughly meaning "Come on, Sweden / being in good spirits is what does the trick") during the football games.

The traveling supporters for Sweden's away games showed up for the first time in the 1974 FIFA World Cup in West Germany, and since then Sweden has always had supporters in large tournaments. In the 2006 FIFA World Cup in Germany, Sweden had one of the largest group of supporters during a tournament, especially during the group stage match against Paraguay with around 50,000 Swedish supporters in attendance, plus an additional 50,000 fans watching the game outside the stadium. The Swedish fans were also voted the best fans during the 2006 World Cup, due to their massive numbers, friendly attitude and love for the game.

Rivalry 

Sweden's main rival is Denmark. The countries have played against each other 107 times, of which Sweden have won 47, drawn 20 and lost 40. The first match between the teams was an 8–0 Denmark win in May 1913. Sweden lost their first five matches against Denmark before their first win in October 1916 by the score 4–0. The first competitive match between the countries was as 1–0 win for Sweden in the group stage of UEFA Euro 1992. Both teams advanced from the group stage and Denmark went on to win the tournament. In UEFA Euro 2004 the teams drew 2–2 in the last group stage match, ensuring that both teams advanced at the expense of Italy. In the qualification for UEFA Euro 2008, Sweden were awarded a 3–0 win away against Denmark after a Danish fan invaded the pitch and attacked the referee. The reverse fixture ended in a goalless draw and Sweden qualified for the final tournament. In the qualification for the 2010 FIFA World Cup, Sweden lost both matches against Denmark by 1–0 and failed to qualify for the World Cup. In the play-offs round of the qualification for UEFA Euro 2016, Sweden defeated Denmark by 4–3 on aggregate to qualify for the final tournament. The most recent match between the countries was a goalless draw in June 2018.

Kit sponsorship 

Sweden traditionally wears yellow shirts, blue shorts, and yellow socks as their home kit, and blue shirts, yellow shorts, and blue socks as their away kit. Since 2013, their kit manufacturer is Adidas, who were also the manufacturer between 1973 and 2003. They were manufactured by Umbro in 1970 as well as between 2003 and 2013.

Home stadium 
Since 2012, the Swedish national stadium is Friends Arena, replacing Råsunda Fotbollsstadion which was demolished. According to FIFA, Råsunda Stadion was a classic stadium, one of only two stadiums in the world, the other one being the Rose Bowl Stadium in Pasadena, California, which hosted both the men's and women's World Cup final (1958 FIFA World Cup final and the 1995 FIFA Women's World Cup). Råsunda stadium was opened 18 September 1910, and had a capacity of only 2,000, mostly standing. It was Råsunda stadium and Valhalla stadium in Gothenburg that were the first football fields with grass used for Swedish football. The stadium was expanded during 1937, to a capacity of 40,000 people. It was used for the football tournament in the 1912 Summer Olympics held in Stockholm, and hosted eight games during the 1958 FIFA World Cup. At the 1992 UEFA European Championship, the stadium hosted four games and in the 1995 FIFA Women's World Cup it hosted only the final game. Ullevi in Gothenburg is used for some home games, such as the centennial game of the Swedish Football Association against England in 2004. Even other stadiums, such as Stadion in Malmö, are used for the national team.

Results and fixtures

2022

2023

Coaching staff

Manager history 
 Chairmen of the Selection Committee

 1908 Ludvig Kornerup
 1909–1911 Wilhelm Friberg
 1912 John Ohlson
 1912–1913 Ruben Gelbord
 1914–1915 Hugo Levin
 1916 Frey Svenson
 1917–1920 Anton Johanson
 1921–1936 John Pettersson
 1937 Carl Linde
 1938–1942 Gustaf Carlson
 1942 Selection Committee
 1943–1956 Rudolf Kock
 1957–1961 Eric Persson

 Head coaches

 1962–1965 Lennart Nyman
 1966–1970 Orvar Bergmark
 1971–1979 Georg Ericson
 1980–1985 Lars Arnesson
 1986–1990 Olle Nordin
 1990 Nisse Andersson
 1991–1997 Tommy Svensson
 1998–1999 Tommy Söderberg
 2000–2004 Lars Lagerbäck and Tommy Söderberg
 2004–2009 Lars Lagerbäck
 2009–2016 Erik Hamrén
 2016– Janne Andersson

Players

Current squad 
The following 26 players have been called up for the UEFA Euro 2024 qualifying matches against Belgium and Azerbaijan on 24 and 27 March 2023, respectively.

Caps and goals are correct as of 12 January 2023, after the match against Iceland.

Recent call-ups 
The following 49 players have also been called up to the Sweden squad within the last twelve months.

Notes
PRE = Preliminary squad / standby
RET = Retired from the national team
SUS = Serving suspension
WD = Player withdrew from the squad

Previous squads 

FIFA World Cup
 1934 World Cup squad
 1938 World Cup squad
 1950 World Cup squad
 1958 World Cup squad
 1970 World Cup squad
 1974 World Cup squad
 1978 World Cup squad
 1990 World Cup squad
 1994 World Cup squad
 2002 World Cup squad
 2006 World Cup squad
 2018 World Cup squad

UEFA European Championship
 Euro 1992 squad
 Euro 2000 squad
 Euro 2004 squad
 Euro 2008 squad
 Euro 2012 squad
 Euro 2016 squad
 Euro 2020 squad

Olympic Games
 1908 Olympics squad
 1912 Olympics squad
 1920 Olympics squad
 1924 Olympics squad
 1936 Olympics squad
 1948 Olympics squad
 1952 Olympics squad

Player records 

Players in bold are still active with Sweden.

 Most capped players 

 Top goalscorers 

 Age-related records 
Age-related records of the Swedish national football team.

 Oldest player 40 years, 5 months and 26 days – Zlatan Ibrahimović (0–2 against Poland on 29 March 2022)
 Youngest debutante 17 years, 2 months and 11 days  – Gunnar Pleijel (5–2 against Finland on 22 October 1911)
 Oldest debutante 34 years, 9 months and 1 day – Stendy Appeltoft (3–0 against Finland on 28 August 1955)
  Longest national career 21 years, 1 month and 29 days – Zlatan Ibrahimović (from 31 January 2001 until 29 March 2022)
 Oldest goalscorer 37 years, 11 months and 26 days – Gunnar Gren (two goals in a 4–4 draw against Denmark on 26 October 1958)
 Youngest goalscorer 17 years, 3 months and 22 days – Alexander Isak (one goal in a 6–0 win against Slovakia on 12 January 2017)

 Notable captains 

This is a list of captains who either have played 30 or more matches as team captain or have played a match as team captain in a major tournament (FIFA World Cup, UEFA Euro and Olympic Games). Note that only players who started the match as captain are included in the list.

The order for this list is by most appearances as captain, then chronological order of first captaincy.

 Competitive record 
 Champions   Runners-up   Third place   Fourth place   Tournament held on home soil  

 FIFA World Cup 

 UEFA European Championship 

 UEFA Nations League 

 Olympic Games 

Football at the Summer Olympics was first played officially in 1908. The Olympiads between 1896 and 1980 were only open for amateur players. The 1984 and 1988 tournaments were open to players with no appearances in the FIFA World Cup. Since 1992 Olympics, the football event was changed into a tournament for under-23 teams with a maximum of three overage players. See Sweden Olympic football team for competition record from 1984 until present day.

 Nordic Football Championship 

 Minor tournaments 

 Head-to-head record 
The following table shows Sweden's all-time international record. The abandoned match against Denmark on 2 June 2007 here counts as a draw. Former national teams are included in their respective successor team. Statistics updated as of 12 January 2023.''

Honours

Major titles 
 FIFA World Cup
 Runner-up (1): 1958
 Third place (2): 1950, 1994
 Fourth place (1): 1938
 UEFA European Championship
 Semi-final (1): 1992
 Olympic football tournament
 Gold Medal (1): 1948
 Bronze Medal (2): 1924, 1952

Minor titles 
 Nordic Football Championship
 Winners (9): 1933–36, 1937–47, 1948–51, 1952–55, 1956–59, 1960–63, 1964–67, 1968–71, 1972–77

See also 

 Denmark–Sweden football rivalry
 Football in Sweden
 Gotland official football team
 Sápmi football team
 Sweden national football B team (defunct)
 Sweden national under-17 football team
 Sweden national under-19 football team
 Sweden national under-20 football team
 Sweden national under-21 football team
 Sweden Olympic football team
 Sweden women's national football team

References

External links 

 Official website by SvFF
 Sweden at FIFA
 Sweden at UEFA
 National team statistics by SvFF
 National team statistics by SFS-Bolletinen
 International results by RSSSF
 Most capped players and top goalscorers by RSSSF

Sweden national football team
European national association football teams
National team
1908 establishments in Sweden